The Army of the Two Sicilies, also known as the Royal Army of His Majesty the King of the Kingdom of the Two Sicilies (Reale esercito di Sua Maestà il Re del Regno delle Due Sicilie), the Bourbon Army (Esercito Borbonico) or the Neapolitan Army (Esercito Napoletano), was the land forces of the Kingdom of the Two Sicilies, whose armed forces also included a navy. It was in existence from 1734 to 1861. It was the land armed force of the new independent state created by the settlement of the Bourbon dynasty in southern Italy following the events of the War of the Polish Succession.

History 
Although the Royal Army arose only in 1734, the Neapolitan and Sicilian military institutions boast a much older history, which lays its foundations in the organization of a "state" army (i.e. state and no longer feudal) by Ferrante of Aragon in 1464. In particular, the Spanish Vice-Chancellor period (1503-1714) customs used by Aragon in Sicily mixed old military traditions from the Norman, Arab, and Byzantine periods. All of these different cultures profoundly marked the military customs of the later Bourbon period. It can be seen in many examples of military clothing including items, such as the Turban which dated back to Emirate of Sicily. During this time the soldiers of southern Italy were in fact involved in almost all the military events of the Spanish Empire (from the Wars of Charles V to the Wars of Flanders, from the colonial campaigns in America to the Thirty Years' War),often showing great value and loyalty to the imperial. The captains, belonging to the best feudal nobility of the Neapolitan and Sicilian provinces, were able to frame and prepare the subjects of the two vice-kingdoms for war, obeying the firm political direction given by the monarchs of Spain.

In the later Bourbon period, however, with the reconquest of independence, the nobility gradually lost this military character, giving way to the new centralizing policy of a dynastic imprint. The goal of the Bourbons was in fact to replace loyalty to the old noble commanders, who had served the Habsburgs for over 200 years, with an exasperated fidelity to the new national crown. This progressive disunity from the obsolete Iberian traditions, promoted by the reforms desired by Ferdinand IV, provoked in the eighteenth century a state of "disorientation" within the Bourbon military institutions that resulted in an almost frenetic sequence of restructuring and reform. This restless evolution of the military structures of the Two Sicilies stopped only with the accession of Ferdinand II, who finally managed to stabilize and rationalize the military systems of the kingdom, giving it a definitively national and dynastic imprint. However, the evolution of the European and Neapolitan political framework of those last 30 years, which fully involved the army of the Two Sicilies, caused political dissent to turn directly against the same bourbon ruling house.

Charles de Bourbon 

1734, the year in which the expeditionary force of Charles de Bourbon conquered the Neapolitan provinces and the following year the kingdom of Sicily, tearing them from the Austrian viceroyalty, also marked the creation of the first entirely "national" regiments, flanked by the foreign regiments with which infante don Carlo had descended in Italy. 

The story of this army naturally fits into the same space of time in which the dynasty of which it was supported lived: from 1734 to 1861. However, following the restoration and establishment in December 1816 of the Kingdom of the Two Sicilies with the formal merger of the two kingdoms, this armed force was deeply reorganized, incorporating also the elements of the Neapolitan army of the Napoleonic age. This historically led to resentment from Sicilian members of the army, and caused many of them to join rebels during the Sicilian 1848 revolution. From 1817, therefore, the official name of Royal Army of His Majesty the King of the Kingdom of the Two Sicilies was adopted; the latter, together with the Army of the Sea, constituted the armed forces of the Kingdom of the Two Sicilies.

Economic treatment 
The officers' salaries consisted of a monthly "penny" which included "housing and furniture", and an "supersold" varying according to the weapon or body to which they belonged. The "penny" was subject to a 2% withholding tax which helped to form the pension fund. After 40 years of service, or at the age of 60, it was therefore possible to obtain withdrawal, with a pension equal to the entire simple "penny". Of course, the officer could also retire early for health reasons: in this case the pension was paid in a reduced form, depending on the length of service. The minimum salary for an officer corresponded to 23 ducats per month (bishop of the line infantry), the maximum salary instead corresponded to 290 ducats per month (lieutenant general). In due proportion, Real Army officers generally had slightly better economic treatment, in every respect, than the parigrade of the Sardinian Army.

The economic treatment of the troop, on the other hand, was mainly based on a daily "prest", varying according to the bodies, and on "monthly checks" for "clothing" and "maintenance": these checks, however, were not paid directly to the military, but only to the Boards of Directors of the regiments to which they belonged, who managed the clothing and maintenance on behalf of each military. Soldiers employed in armed services received a "mobile column diary", varying according to the rank and use of the department to which they belong. The military with at least 10 years of service was also entitled to a seniority allowance, which consisted of a gradual increase in the "daily prest" directly proportional to the period spent under arms. The "daily prest" of the troop ranged from the 10 grains of the simple line infantry soldier to the 54 grain of the battalion helper. The monthly dress allowance corresponded to 80 grains, the maintenance allowance to 40 grains. The seniority allowance consisted of an increase in the "daily prest" of 1 grain for the military with at least 10 years of service and three grains for those over 25 years of age (veterans' medal). On the basis of the conversion from Bourbon duchies into Italian lire of 1862 (1 duchy = 4.25 lire) it is obtained that the "prest" of bourbon soldiers was in line with that of the Sabaudi soldiers, but already the non-commissioned officers of the Real Army received a much better pay than Sardinian non-commissioned officers (about 20%. It should also be noted that the cost of living in the Two Sicilies was quite low and that the value of the Neapolitan currency was higher than the Piedmontese currency. To get an idea of the size of the salaries of neapolitan soldiers it is possible to compare their daily pay to that of the workers of the time: the workers of Campania received on average a daily wage of about 40/50 grain (those of the poorest provinces about half), the metalworkers 75 grains per day and the foremen about 85 grains per day. The prices were also quite stable and low: a pizza cost on average 2 grains, 0.75 L of wine 2 grains, 1 kg of bread 6 grains, 1 kg of pasta 8 grains, 1 kg of beef 16 grain and 1 kg of cheese 32 grains. The average rent for a worker's dwelling was about 12 ducats per year.

Uniforms in the Army of the Two Sicilies 

The first uniforms of the Royal Army were Spanish in type, in accordance with the Ordinance of 1728. The oldest source able to give us an idea of the first Neapolitan uniforms is the Ordinance of 1744 on the constitution of the 12 provincial regiments: the soldiers of these regiments had to be equipped with a knee-length "jacket", a "jaguar" (waistcoat with sleeves) just short of the javelin, knee-length breeches, gaiters that exceeded knee height (the cavalry was equipped with spur boots), a white shirt and a black tie. The attire was complemented by a black felt tricorn with a red cockade on the left wing. Some details of the uniforms (buttons, lapels, embroidery, buffeterie, type of Turban, and colors in general) varied depending on the rank and department (the officers, for example, were traditionally equipped with a goliera on which the Bourbon lilies were imprinted). In the 1870s, some novelties were introduced: the jackets were considerably shortened and the uniforms streamlined. With the decade French there were countless evolutions also with regard to uniforms: at first the Napoleonic model French was followed, but then the Neapolitan army was given a strong local imprint, especially from the Island of Sicily.  From 1830, the Bourbon uniform was redesigned on the basis of the French "Luigi Filippo" (Louis Philippe) style; from then until the fall of the kingdom the French influence remained evident in almost all Bourbon equipment.

North African and Foreign Departments 
The Royal Army had foreign departments since its in origin, in particular Albanians, Arabs, North Africans and Swiss (in addition to the Walloon and Irish departments, which had arrived in the wake of Charles de Bourbon). In 1737 an Albanian regiment was formed, called "Macedonia", thanks to the intercession of the Primate Epirota residing in Naples, which recruited its compatriots in competition with the Venetian regiments oltremarini in Corfu and Epirus. Later an attempt was made to extend recruitment also to the indigenous Albanian communities of southern Italy and Sicily, however by the end of the 1700s the Regiment "Albania" had become a real foreign regiment in which soldiers of the most diverse nationalities converged. Characteristic of the equipment of the Albanian departments was the "cangiarro", a short sabre of Ottoman derivation (kandjar). The Arab and North African regiments used similar Ottoman or Moorish based insignia to that used by the Albanians. Swiss regiments were already present in 1734 (However less numerous) at the Bourbon conquest of the realm among the troops of King Charles, ceded by Spain to the young king. The Neapolitan Swiss corps were temporarily dissolved in 1790, but already in 1799 a new foreign regiment was created called "Alemagna", intended to frame the Swiss oriundi military and those just arrived from across the Alps (as well as Germans, Italians, Swabian and other foreigners). Many of the foreign 'Swiss' regiments however were disbanded following the Napoleonic conquest of the realm.

The Royal Army recruited four new non-Swiss (Mainly Tunisian, as well as other North African) regiments between 1825 and 1830, following the reconstitution of a national army and the capitulations between the Bourbon government, there were many attacks on the shores of the Island of Sicily. The Bourbon government was able to counter these attacks by forcing those who were caught at war to serve in the army.

Each regiment in accordance with Bourbon regulations consisted of a general staff of 20 officers, a minor state of 17 soldiers and two battalions, each consisting of 24 officers and 684 soldiers divided into four rifle companies and 2 chosen companies, one of Greasers and the other of Hunters. The North African recruits accepted the engagement in the Army of the Two Sicilies voluntarily for a four-year stay, at the end of which they could renew for another 2 or 4 years of stoppage, or take permanent leave. Soldiers who had reached age limits, but still skilled in military service and willing to continue in their profession, could join special companies called "Moor Veterans".

Battles the army was involved in 

 Battle of Velletri
 Wars of the First Coalition
 Siege of Toulon
 Wars of the Second Coalition
 Wars of the Third Coalition
 First Italian War of Independence
 Battle of Volturno
 Battle of Garigliano
 Siege of Gaeta

References

Army
Two Sicilies